Kaala Bhairava is an Indian playback singer and music director who works predominantly in Telugu cinema. He has sung songs in Tamil, Hindi and Kannada in addition to Telugu. He was the composer of the films Mathu Vadalara and Colour Photo, which received positive reviews and critical acclaim.

Career 
He garnered acclaim for his songs in Baahubali 2: The Conclusion (2017) and "Peniviti" from Aravinda Sametha Veera Raghava (2018). He made his debut as a music director with Mathu Vadalara (2019) starring his younger brother Sri Simha.

He is best known in the west for his work with his father on the soundtrack for the 2022 film RRR. Bhairava and Rahul Sipligunj performed the Oscar-winning song "Naatu Naatu" at the 95th Academy Awards on 12 March 2023.

Early life 
His father, M. M. Keeravani, is a popular music composer while his brother Sri Simha is an actor. He is a relative of director S. S. Rajamouli.

Discography

As playback singer 
(D) indicates dubbed version.

As composer

Music videos/Singles

Awards and nominations

References

External links 

Living people
Male actors in Telugu cinema
Indian male film actors
21st-century Indian male actors
21st-century Indian singers
Telugu playback singers
Telugu film score composers
Kannada playback singers
Tamil playback singers
Bollywood playback singers
1991 births